The Wright Valley, named after Sir Charles Wright, is the central one of the three large Dry Valleys in the Transantarctic Mountains, located west of McMurdo Sound at approximately .  Wright Valley contains the Onyx River, the longest river in Antarctica, Lake Brownworth, the origin of the Onyx River, and Lake Vanda, which is fed by the Onyx River. Its southwestern branch, South Fork, is the location of Don Juan Pond.  The upland area known as the Labyrinth is at the valley's west end.

Although portions of the interconnected valley system were discovered in 1903 by the Discovery expedition led by Captain Robert Falcon Scott, the Wright Valley located near the centre of the system was not seen until aerial photographs of the region were made in 1947.
By the mid 1960s scientists were becoming increasingly intrigued by the paradoxical fact that the valley lay immediately adjacent to the permanent East Antarctic Ice Sheet, yet had remained ice-free for at least thousands of years.

Increasing summer field activity and a clear need to establish a winter record led New Zealand's Antarctic Division and the National Science Foundation of the United States to plan a more permanent base in the valley.  In 1968 New Zealand established Vanda Station near the eastern end of Lake Vanda.

Martin Cirque occupies the south wall of Wright Valley between Denton Glacier and Nichols Ridge.

See also
Connell Pond
Headwall Pond
Lake Bull
 Dry Valleys Geology
Sarcophagus Pond
Taylor Valley (south)
Victoria Valley (north)

References

External links
Wright Valley panoramic picture, view from Dais intrusion

Valleys of Victoria Land
McMurdo Dry Valleys
Transantarctic Mountains